"The Rogue Prince" is the second episode of the first season of the HBO fantasy drama television series House of the Dragon, named after George R. R. Martin's 2014 novelette. The episode first aired on August 28, 2022, and was written by series creator Ryan Condal and directed by Greg Yaitanes.

It received generally positive reviews, with critics praising its production design, the performances of Milly Alcock and Matt Smith, and the confrontation between Daemon and Rhaenyra at Dragonstone, though some criticized it for being "talky".

Plot

On the Stepstones 
Prince-Admiral Craghas Drahar of the Triarchy, an alliance of the Free Cities of Essos, attacks Westerosi ships in the Stepstones regions with his pirate fleet. He is known as the Crabfeeder because he nails his enemies to posts on the beach, leaving them to be slowly eaten alive by crabs.

In King's Landing 
Six months have passed since Rhaenyra's anointing as heir to the Iron Throne. Master of Ships Lord Corlys Velaryon demands that the Small Council take action after the Triarchy-backed pirates destroy four Westerosi vessels. Viserys refuses, wanting to avoid open warfare with Essos. He dismisses Rhaenyra's suggestion to show force against Drahar, and instead relegates her to choosing a new Kingsguard knight. Over protests from Otto and newly-appointed Lord Commander Ser Harrold Westerling, she chooses Ser Criston, the only candidate with actual battle experience. 

Lady Alicent continues to secretly console Viserys. She eventually advises that he speak with Rhaenyra about Queen Aemma's death and the expectation for a king to remarry. Ser Corlys and Rhaenys suggest that Viserys unite their Houses by marrying their twelve-year-old daughter, Lady Laena.

The Small Council learns Daemon, who previously seized Dragonstone, stole the dragon egg that was intended for the late Prince Baelon and has declared his intentions to marry his mistress, Mysaria, who he claims is pregnant, as his second wife. Ser Otto persuades Viserys to allow him to confront Daemon.

On Dragonstone 
Daemon, who is illegally occupying Dragonstone, is supported by a loyal cadre of City Watch guards. Ser Otto and a small detachment arrive to confront Daemon, demanding he return the dragon egg. As bloodshed looms, Rhaenyra arrives on her dragon, Syrax. She persuades Daemon to peacefully return the egg to her.

In King's Landing, Redux 
Rhaenyra's disobedience in going to Dragonstone angers the king, prompting a heartfelt discussion regarding his remarrying to fortify the Targaryen line of succession. Ultimately, Viserys announces his intention to wed Alicent, shocking and angering both Rhaenyra and Lord Corlys.

At Driftmark 
Lord Corlys, insulted by Viserys rejecting his daughter's hand in marriage, secretly meets with Prince Daemon. Lord Corlys proposes they form an alliance to retake the Stepstones, using the victory to their mutual advantage.

Production

Writing 
"The Rogue Prince" was written by showrunner and executive producer Ryan Condal, who also wrote the pilot episode.

The title of the episode is named after George R. R. Martin's 2014 novelette of the same name.

Filming 
The episode was directed by Greg Yaitanes, marking his first time in the Game of Thrones franchise.

Casting 
The episode stars Paddy Considine, Matt Smith, Rhys Ifans, Steve Toussaint, Eve Best, Sonoya Mizuno, Fabien Frankel, Milly Alcock, Emily Carey, and Graham McTavish.

Reception

Ratings
"The Rogue Prince" was watched by 10.2 million U.S. viewers on all platforms when it premiered, based on data from the Nielsen Corporation and HBO. With an increase in viewership of 2%, it was a rare feat for an episode succeeding the premiere. On HBO alone, an estimated 2.26 million viewers watched the episode during its first broadcast. The viewership for four broadcasts during the premiere night was 3.5 million, an increase of 9.4% from the previous episode.

Critical response
The episode received generally positive reviews. On the review aggregator Rotten Tomatoes, it holds an approval rating of 85% based on 122 reviews, with an average rating of 7.4/10. The site's critical consensus said, "Stolen dragon eggs and awkward matchmaking add up to an installment that is designed to lay foundations rather than dazzle in its own right, but 'The Rogue Prince' succeeds in nesting juicy conflicts."

Helen O'Hara of IGN gave the episode a rating of 8 out of 10 and said, "House Of The Dragon's holds its strong momentum in its second week. This episode mostly moves pieces into new, more dangerous places – but some of those pieces are dragons so who cares?" She also highlighted the confrontation at Dragonstone between Daemon and Rhaenyra as "the best moment of the series so far" and praised Condal's writing and Ifans' performance. Writing for Rolling Stone, Sean T. Collins summarized the episode with: "Striking imagery, compelling intrigue, humane performances: Put it all together and you've got some damn fine fantasy television. And with a new queen on the way and war on the horizon, we have a feeling things are about to get wild in Westeros once again." He also praised the performances, particularly Considine's and Alcock's.

In a mixed review, Alec Bojalad of Den of Geek rated it two and a half out of five stars. He deemed it as a "talky" episode that is weaker than the premiere episode and said, "an awkward hour of television that doesn't fully extinguish the show's hopes of being a worthy heir to the Iron Throne." However, he praised its production value, visuals, the confrontation between Rhaenyra and Daemon, and the final scene between Corlys and Daemon. Grading the episode with a "C+," Jenna Scherer of The A.V. Club stated the episode was "talky" and made up of "85-percent courtly machinations" while praising the confrontation between Daemon and Rhaenyra, writing that the show "desperately needs more scenes" like it as the show's focus on conversations and palace intrigue were becoming "boring." Vulture's Hillary Kelly gave it a rating of three out of five and called it, "heavy on exposition and light on fornication," and also praised the confrontation at Dragonstone, saying, "there is finally some delicious, vicious tension in the air."

References

External links
 "The Rogue Prince" at HBO
 

2022 American television episodes
House of the Dragon episodes